Lauriane Doumbouya née Darboux is the current First Lady of Guinea since 5 September 2021. She is from France and is the wife of the interim President of Guinea, Mamady Doumbouya who took power in the 2021 Guinean coup d'état. She is an active duty member of the French National Gendarmerie.

Personal life 
Darboux's family is from the south of France, and she worked as an active duty police officer in the French National Gendarmerie in the town of Valence, Drôme. She is married to the Guinean military officer Mamady Doumbouya. The couple have four children (a daughter and three sons) .

References 

Living people
People from Drôme
French police officers
First ladies of Guinea
French emigrants to Guinea
Guinean people of French descent
Year of birth missing (living people)